Olaf Jentzsch (born 3 December 1958) is a German former racing cyclist. He rode in the 1992 Tour de France.

References

External links
 

1958 births
Living people
German male cyclists
Place of birth missing (living people)
People from Riesa
East German male cyclists
Cyclists from Saxony
People from Bezirk Dresden